Calocochlia chocolatina is a subgenus of land snail, a marine gastropod mollusk in the family Bradybaenidae.

Original description information
Poppe, G. T., Tagaro, S. P. & Sarino, J. 2015 A new Bradybaenidae and Two new Diplommatinidae from the Philippines. — Visaya Germany (ConchBooks. Hackenheim.) Vol. 4(3): 4-14, 4 pls.

References

Camaenidae